Mountain Line Transit Authority is the main provider of public transportation located in Morgantown, West Virginia and the surrounding area. It is also the provider of bus service on the campus of West Virginia University. Inter-city bus service to Fairmont, Clarksburg, Waynesburg, PA, Pittsburgh, PA, and the Pittsburgh International Airport is achieved with the Grey Line. Fare for all local routes is $0.75 (Purple UTC is $1.00), while Grey Line can cost up to $20 for a single person to Pittsburgh International Airport from Clarksburg WV.

Route list (Until August 6th, 2018)

1 Campus PM  
Towers to downtown by way of Ruby Hospital, Valley View Ave., and Stewart St., while serving University Ave. on the return to Towers. Has a variable frequency Thurs-Sat while WVU is in session.

2 Downtown/Mall PM  
Like Campus PM, except continuing onto the Morgantown Mall after downtown. Leaves Towers every hour Mon-Sat.

3 Green Line 
Runs at XX:30, XX:00, and XX:50
Green Line Commons - Downtown to Morgantown Mall and the Commons by way of Westover. Leaves at the bottom of the hour every hour (:30) Mon-Sat. There are also Sunday runs leaving from the Mountainlair at variable times. This was the westbound half of the old Green Line.
Green Line Express - Downtown to Morgantown Mall. Does not serve the Commons above the mall. Leaves at the top of the hour (:00) Mon-Sat.
Green Mylan - Downtown to Mylan Park by way of the Morgantown Mall. Daytime runs leave at ten till the hour (:50), while evening runs leave at the bottom of the hour (:30) Mon-Sat. There are also Sunday runs leaving at the Walnut St. PRT Station at the top of the hour (:00).

4 Orange Line 
Runs Hourly
Orange Line South - Downtown to Mountaineer Mall by way of South Park, Morgantown High School, South High St., Dorsey Ave. and First Ward. Leaves at the top of every hour (:00).
Orange Line North - Does not run anymore. Downtown to University Town Center outbound by way of Westover and the Morgantown Mall and inbound by way of the WVU Coliseum, Towers, Evansdale Dr., and Beechurst Ave. Leaves at the top of every hour (:00). Route now covered by Green Line Express, Purple UTC, and Beechurst Express.

6 Gold Line 
Runs Hourly Mon-Fri. Various times on Sat.
Gold Line H - Downtown to Ruby Memorial and Mon General Hospitals by way of University Ave. Leaves at the top of the even hours M-F.
Gold Line VV - Downtown to Independence Hill MHP by way of University Ave., Towers, Mountaineer Station, Indp. Hills, & North Hills. Leaves at the top of the odd hours M-F.

7 Red Line 
Downtown to Star City by way of University Ave. and Towers outbound to the neighbourhoods of Star City while serving Mountaineer Station on the inbound trip before continuing on to Towers and University Ave. Leaves at various times during the day Mon-Sat.

8 Tyrone Road 
Downtown to Cheat Lake by way of Richwood Ave., Sabraton, Brookhaven, Richard, Dellslow, Tyrone Road, Tyrone-Avery Road, Cheat Road, and Fairchance Road. Leaves the downtown depot every 90 minutes starting at 6:30am. It would originally allow a deviation request to the Pierpont Center before taking I-68 from Exit 7 to Exit 10 before the old iron bridge was replaced over Cheat Lake. That deviation request is no longer allowed, so Pink Line must be used from the Depot or Blue Line if picked up along its route.

9 Purple Line 
Purple STC - Downtown to Suncrest Town Center by way of The Mountainlair, Stewart St., and the Suncrest Town Center before heading up to Chestnut Ridge Apts., Valley View Ave., and then back on to Stewart St. towards The Mountainlair. Leaves at the bottom of the hour (:30).
Purple UTC - Downtown to University Town Center by way of The Mountainlair, Stewart St., Suncrest Town Center, Ruby Memorial Hospital, Towers, Patterson Drive, WVU Coliseum, and University Town Center. Inbound also serves Chestnut Ridge Apts. and Valley View Ave. after going through the Suncrest Town Center before continuing on downtown. Leaves the depot every other hour starting at 7:00am Mon-Sat.
Purple on Sundays - Westover Terminal to Towers by way of The Mountainlair, Stewart St., Suncrest Town Center, and Ruby Memorial Hospital. Leaves Westover at the top of every hour (:00).

11 Cassville 
Downtown to University Town Center and Cassville/New Hill by way of Westover, Granville, and Bertha Hill. Leaves the downtown depot every half hour.

12 Blue Line 
Downtown to University High School by way of Richwood Ave., Morgantown Municipal Airport, and Easton Hill. Coming back from UHS, the route goes by way of Canyon Road and the Pierpont Center by request. Blue Line leaves the Depot at the bottom of the hour (:30).

13 Crown  
Downtown to Crown. Passes Laurel Point, Arnettsville Community Center, Crown, Everettsville, Opekiska Dam, and Booth while traveling Dupont Road, River Road, and Fairmont Road (US Rt. 19). There are three runs, last one being in reverse direction. The first two start at the top of the hour (:00), while the last one starts at quarter past five (5:15pm) Mon-Sat.

14 Mountain Heights 
Mtn. Heights Express - Downtown to Mountaineer Mall by way of Brockway Ave. and Greenbag Road. Has two runs Mon-Fri at 11:45am and 1:00pm
Mtn. Heights Full - Downtown to Summer School Road and the Kingwood Pike by way of Brockway Ave., Sabraton, Summer School Road, Kingwood Pike, Mountaineer Mall, the DMV, and back to downtown. Has three runs during the day. First two start at five after the hour (:05), while the last one starts at quarter past four (4:15pm).

15 Grafton/Fairmont Road 
Grafton Rd to WalMart - Downtown to WalMart by way of the South U Plaza and Scott Ave. Leaves at the top of every hour (:00).
Grafton Rd Full - Passes by South U Plaza, Morgantown Motel, Ashton Estates, Pilot Station, Triune-Halleck VFD, Clinton VFD, and WalMart while traveling Rt. 73, Halleck Road, and Grafton Road. The two runs that it has leave the downtown depot at 9:10am and 3:05pm.

16 Pink Line  
Downtown to the Pierpont Center by way of Willey St. and the Mileground. Runs at twenty minutes past the hour (:20).

29 Grey Line 
Express Route
Provides service from Morgantown to Fairmont, WV; Clarksburg, WV; Waynesburg, PA; Washington, PA; Pittsburgh, PA; and Pittsburgh International Airport.

30 West Run 
Express Route
Daytime and Evening Runs - West Run Complex to the University Ave. & Falling Run bus shelter by way of Stewart Street. Runs Mon-Fri every twenty minutes during the day year round and every half hour in the evenings WVU fall and spring semesters only.
Late Night Runs - West Run Complex to the Courthouse by way of Stewart Street and the Mountainlair. Runs Thurs-Sat during WVU fall and spring semesters. Runs every half hour.

38 Blue & Gold Connector 
Express Route
Towers to Grant Street by way of the Law School and back by way of Beechurst Ave. and Patterson Drive. Frequency of every twenty minutes Mon-Sat, with Sunday runs to the Morgantown Mall.

39 Beechurst Express 
Express Route
This route travels the reverse direction of Route 38 Blue & Gold, except University Ave. instead of Grant Street. Runs every twenty minutes Mon-Fri WVU fall and spring semesters.

44 Valley View 
Express Route
Runs a loop between the University Ave. and Falling Run Road bus shelter and Valley View Avenue by way of Stewart Street and Willowdale Road. This route has a frequency of every fifteen minutes.

52 Wadestown 
New route started June 4th 2018. Starts at Westover terminal, then heads onto I-79 to University Town Centre before going out WV Route 7 past Cassville, Mason-Dixon Park, Blacksville, Clay-Batelle High School, until reaching Wadestown. Scheduled for the trip to take one hour each direction.

Park and Ride Locations
Westover (Routes 3 and 13)
Granville (Route 11)
Cheat Lake (Route 8)

Fleet
Mountain Line consists of three brands of vehicles; Gillig, Ford, and IC. There are two types of vehicles in use; Low floor where there is only one step up from outside, and the higher floor vehicles where there is at least three steps coming up from the service door.

As of the beginning of 2017, These are the vehicles that Mountain Line still have in passenger service, All of the IC Transit Buses where sold by 2018, the last 2 IC bus was sold in 2020 and no longer apart of Mountain Line Transit.

Units being used now.         
101,140,141,142,143,144,151,152,155,156,158,159,180,181,182,183,191,192,193,194,195,196,197,291,292,293,294,295,296,2109,2108,2107,2105,2106

External links

Transit agencies in West Virginia
Bus transportation in West Virginia
Transportation in Monongalia County, West Virginia
Morgantown, West Virginia